Michael B. Pollock (born March 9, 1965) is an American voice actor, best known as the voice of Doctor Eggman in the Sonic the Hedgehog franchise since 2003. He voiced many characters in various anime English dubs and video games. He voiced the narrator, Raoul Contesta, and Drayden in the Pokémon series, Adon Coborlwitz from Berserk, Meat from Ultimate Muscle, Langston Lickatoad from Viva Piñata, Suikyou from the Ikki Tousen series, and Beast in the motion comic adaptation of Astonishing X-Men.

Early life
Michael B. Pollock was born on March 9, 1965, the son of Herb Lawrence Pollock. He is Jewish and has described himself as "secular but religious aware". He is sometimes credited with his father's name in tribute. He worked in radio in Upstate New York in the 1980s. He graduated from Roslyn High School in 1983, where he was involved with their theater program, called the Royal Crown Players.

Career
When he returned to New York City in the 1990s, he was booked into some children's videos, anime and an episode of Pokémon. Pollock recalls it was director Eric Stuart who brought him in as a guest spot for Pokémon and he then got recommended for roles in Kirby: Right Back at Ya!, Ultimate Muscle, and the FoxBox promotion announcer.  His first major anime role was Meat in Ultimate Muscle.

Pollock first took the role of Doctor Eggman in the English dub of Sonic X, in which he also portrayed Professor Gerald Robotnik. Pollock assumed the role of Eggman in the video game series beginning with the 2005 games Shadow the Hedgehog and Sonic Rush, as part of an initiative by SEGA to maintain vocal consistency between the concurrent video game/TV portrayals of the Sonic the Hedgehog franchise.

Several anime websites, anime conventions, podcasters, and interviewers have commented on Pollock's performance as Dr. Eggman in numerous video games and animated series within the Sonic franchise. His performance as Dr. Eggman has become identified with the character.

On July 15, 2010, Sega announced that the Sonic the Hedgehog franchise would undergo a re-casting, with a new set of voice actors based in Los Angeles, California assuming the roles of each character; however, it was also announced that Pollock would continue to voice Dr. Eggman as according to Pollock none of the actors who auditioned fit Eggman well.

Pollock has reprised his role of Dr. Eggman on the TV series Sonic Boom, which premiered on November 8, 2014. Pollock has currently held the role for longer than any other English-speaking actor.

For Teleflora's Mother's Day campaign in 2016, Pollock narrated Vince Lombardi's "What It Takes to Be Number One" speech in a commercial video called "One Tough Mother".

Personal life 
His brother, Bill Pollock, is the director of a publishing house No Starch Press.

Filmography

Anime

Animation

Film

Video games

Radio

Web

Other roles

Awards and nominations

References

Bibliography

External links 
 
 
 
 

1965 births
Living people
American male voice actors
American male video game actors
Pokémon
Sega people
People from Roslyn Heights, New York
Smite (video game)
Roslyn High School alumni
American people of Jewish descent
Jewish American actors